Pagal Nilavu (lit.:Day's Moon) is a 2016 Indian Tamil-language soap opera, starring Syed Anwar Ahmed, Sameera Sherief, Shivani Narayanan, Mohammed Azeem, Vignesh Karthick and Soundarya Bala Nandakumar. It started airing on 9 May 2016 on STAR Vijay.

The series is the sequel and next generation story of Andal Azhagar, both of which were directed by Francis Kathiravan.

It is a story about love, but circumstances have made Andal and Azhagar's families rival for two generations. The drama explores whether their daughters, Revathy (Soundarya Bala Nandakumar) and Sakthi (Sameera Sherief) reunite the family.

Cast

Main cast
 Syed Anwar Ahmed as  Prabhakaran "Prabha" , Sakthivel and Malar Son , Sakthi's Husband , Karthick Half Brother and Sneha's ex Fiencee (2016-2018)
 Sameera Sherief as Sakthi Prabhakaran Andal Azhagar's elder daughter and Praba's wife also Sneha's cousin (2016-2018)
 Shivani Narayanan as Sneha Arjun , Arjun Wife , Prabha ex fiencée , Revathi brother daughter , Sakthi and Revathi's Cousin Sister (2016 - 2019)
 Mohammed Azeem as Arjun , Sneha Husband , Thamizh Ex fiancée , Malarvizhi Assistant (2017 - 2019)
 Vignesh Karthick as Karthick: Sakthivel and Revathi's son and Praba's half-brother, Revathy Husband; Sneha's best friend (2016-2018)
 Soundarya Bala Nandakumar as Revathy Karthick: Andal Azhagar's  younger daughter, Karthick Wife and Sneha's cousin (2016-2018)

Supporting cast
 Udhayabhanu Maheswaran as Sakthivel: Revathi and Malar's husband; Praba, Karthick and Thamizh's father and Andal's brother (2016-2019)
Sindhu Shyam as Revathi , Sakthivel First Wife , Karthick's Mother, Azhagar's sister also Sakthi, Revathy and Sneha's aunt (2016-2019)
Reshma Pasupuleti → Suzane George → Dr. Sharmila as Malarvizhi Sakthivel a.k.a. "Malar" Sakthivel's Second wife and Praba and Thamizh's mother (Main Antagonist)
 Sreenidhi Sudarshan / Sahana Reddy as Thamizhselvi "Thamizh" , Prabha's Sister , Karthick Half Sister , Sakthivel and Malar Daughter , Sneha's arch-rival, Arjun's ex-fiancée , Vikram's love interest  (2016- 2019) (Dead)
Mona Bedre as Andal Azhagar: Azhagar's wife, Sakthivel's sister; Sakthi and Revathi's mother (2016-2019)
Manush as Azhagarsamy a.k.a. Azhagar: Andal's husband, Revathi's brother; Sakthi and Revathi's father also Sneha's uncle (2016-2019)
Rekha Suresh as Ramya: Sneha's mother and Revathi's best friend also her brother's wife, Dileep's Paternal Aunt (2016-2018) (Dead)
Rathinavel as Malar's brother (Antagonist) and Sakthivel's Politician friend (2016-2019)
 Mithun Raj as Dileep: Ramya's brother's son and Sneha's ex-fiancé (Antagonist) (2017-2019)
 Deepa as Subatra: Andal's Sister-in-law and Kayal's mother (Comedian) (2016-2019)
 P.S.Chitra as Kayal: Subatra's daughter (2016-2018)
 Sathya as Inspector Sathya: Sneha's well-wisher (2018-2019)
 Jeeva as Vikram: Thamizh's love interest (2018-2019)
 Saif Ali Khan as Professor Ram: Sakthi and Sneha's enemy (Antagonist) (2017-2018)
 K. Natraj as Chidambaram: Andal and Sakthivel's father, Prabha , Karthick , Sakthi , Revathi , Sneha and Thamizh Grandfather 
Raghavendran as Palsamy
 Mani K. L. as Mani
 Ramesh Nallayan as Karthik and Sneha's friend
 Anand Amirthalingam as Vinay
 Shivakanth as Shiva
 Krishna Kumar as Krishna
 Manikandaraj Major as Vigilance officer
 Anita Nair as Dhara Bhai
 Gemini as Anand
 Karthik as Senior student
 Jeevanantham as Kuruvi
 
 R. Shyam as Rathinavel
 
 Subbaiah as Aaruchamy
 Sheela as Viji Chidambaram: Andal and Sakthivel's mother, Sakthi, Revathi, Thamizh, Praba and Karthick's grandmother (2016-2019)
 Chandraprakash as Murugesan: Azhagar, Revathi's father. Sakthi, Revathi, Sneha and Karthick's grandfather (2016-2017)
 Vanitha Hariharan as Nikhila "Nikki" Karthick and Sneha's friend
 Gemini Mani as Poosari: Sakthivel's best friend
 Raghavan as Dinesh
 Pavithra Janani as Karthika 
 Priya as Vadivu Murugesan: Azhagar, Revathi's mother Sakthi, Revathi, Sneha and Karthick's grandmother (2016-2017)

Awards and nominations

See also
 Andal Azhagar

References

External links
official website

Star Vijay original programming
Tamil-language romance television series
2010s Tamil-language television series
2016 Tamil-language television series debuts
Tamil-language television shows
2019 Tamil-language television series endings